Maria Elena Ubina, (born January 13, 1995 in New York) is a professional squash player who represents the United States. She reached a career high world ranking of World No. 110 in January 2014.

References

External links 

American female squash players
Living people
1995 births
21st-century American women